James Alexander Grant  (31 August 1931 – 10 July 2019) was an Australian Anglican bishop who was the Dean of Melbourne from 1985 to 1999.

Grant was educated at the University of Melbourne where he took a BA(Hons) in history. After further studies at the Trinity College Theological School, Melbourne, during 1957 and 1958, where he was awarded the Hey Sharp Prize in the Licentiate of Theology examination, he was ordained in 1959. He also obtained a Bachelor of Divinity from the Melbourne College of Divinity in 1968.

After curacies in Murrumbeena and Broadmeadows he was chaplain to Frank Woods, Anglican Archbishop of Melbourne, from 1966 until his consecration as a coadjutor bishop in Melbourne on 21 December 1970 at St Paul's Cathedral, Melbourne. Grant was also chaplain of Trinity College from 1970 to 1975 and dean of St Paul's Cathedral, Melbourne, 1985–99. He had been chairman of Lowther Hall CEGGS, Tintern CEGGS, Melbourne CEGGS, the Brotherhood of St Laurence and the Mission to Streets and Lanes.

Grant collaborated with Geoffrey Serle in the publication of The Melbourne Scene (1957), is the author of the centenary history of Trinity College, Perspective of a Century (1972), and a history of Anglicans in Victoria, Episcopally Led and Synodically Governed: Anglicans in Victoria 1803–1997 (2010). He was made a Member of the Order of Australia in 1994, received a Jubilee Medal in 1977 and a Centenary Medal in 2001 and in his retirement continued to serve Trinity College as its bequest officer.

Personal 
Grant died on 10 July 2019. His widow is Rowena Armstrong , a former Victorian Chief Parliamentary Counsel.

References

1931 births
2019 deaths
Australian Anglican priests
University of Melbourne alumni
People educated at Trinity College (University of Melbourne)
Deans of Melbourne
Members of the Order of Australia
Assistant bishops in the Anglican Diocese of Melbourne
Religious leaders from Melbourne
Recipients of the Centenary Medal